Sharjah (Gulf Arabic: aš-Šārja) is the third-most populous city in the United Arab Emirates, after Dubai and Abu Dhabi. It is the capital of the Emirate of Sharjah and forms part of the Dubai-Sharjah-Ajman metropolitan area.

Sharjah is the capital of the eponymous emirate. The emirate shares legal, political, military and economic functions with the other emirates of the UAE within a federal framework, although each emirate has jurisdiction over some functions such as civil law enforcement and provision and upkeep of local facilities. Sharjah has been ruled by the Al Qasimi dynasty since the 18th century.

The city is a centre for culture and industry, and alone contributes 7.4% of the GDP of the United Arab Emirates. The city covers an approximate area of 235 km2 and has a population of over 800,000 (2008). The sale or consumption of alcoholic beverages is prohibited in the emirate of Sharjah without possession of an alcohol licence and alcohol is not served in hotels, restaurants or other outlets in Sharjah, due to the Muslim majority in the area. This has helped Sharjah increase the number of Islamic tourists who visit the country. Sharjah has been officially named as a WHO healthy city. The 2016 edition of QS Best Student Cities ranked Sharjah as the 68th best city in the world to be a university student. Sharjah is regarded as the cultural capital of the UAE, and was the Islamic culture capital in 2014. Sharjah was named World Book Capital for 2019 by UNESCO.

Etymology
Sultan Al Omaimi, a UAE poet and researcher in folk literature, says that some historians speculate that Sharjah was the name of an idol worshipped in the ancient era which was known as Abed Al Shareq.

Other researchers link the word Sharjah to the fact that the city is located to the east ('sharq' means 'east' in Arabic), of Dubai and Abu Dhabi.

History

Sharjah was historically one of the wealthiest towns in this region with a settlement in existence for over 5000 years. In the early 18th century, the Qawasim clan (Huwayla tribe) established itself in Sharjah, c. 1727 declaring Sharjah independent. On 8 January 1820, Sheikh Sultan I signed the General Maritime Treaty with Britain, accepting a protectorate to keep the Ottoman Turks out. Like four of its neighbours, Ajman, Dubai, Ras Al Khaimah, and Umm Al Quwain, its position on the route to India made it important enough to be recognised as a salute state (be it of the lowest class: 3 guns).

In 1829, English author and traveler James Silk Buckingham described Sharjah as such:

By the turn of the 20th century, Sharjah extended inland to the area now known as Wasit Suburb, the area between the city and Dhaid being under the control of the tribes of the interior. With some 15,000 inhabitants, Sharjah had some 4 or 5 shops in Layyah and a bazaar of some 200 shops in Sharjah proper.

At the height of World War II, Nazi propaganda infiltrated the town. Loud transmissions of pro-Hitler speeches could be heard emanating from the Sheikh of Sharjah's palace during a period in 1940, and messages sharing a similar sentiment had been graffitied on walls in the town centre according to British intelligence reports at the time. Because the message being propagated by the Germans was one of anti-imperialism, it found a sympathetic audience among the emirate's populace, particularly Abdullah bin Faris, a secretary of the Sheikh who was responsible for the broadcasts. After the Sheikh was confronted by the British, he wrote a letter reiterating his support for the British war efforts and disputed the charges laid out against bin Faris. Attached to the letter was a petition signed by 48 prominent individuals testifying to bin Faris' character, which, according to the British, had been misrepresented to the signees. The incident resolved after the Sheikh and bin Faris ceased from transmitting propaganda and doubled down on their support of the British.

On 2 December 1971, Sharjah, together with Abu Dhabi, Dubai, Ajman, Umm Al Qawain and Fujairah joined in the Act of Union to form the United Arab Emirates. The seventh emirate, Ras Al Khaimah, joined the UAE on 10 February 1972, following giant non-Arab neighbour Iran's annexation of the RAK-owned Tunbs islands.

Like the other former Trucial States, Sharjah's name is known by many stamp collectors because of the large numbers of stamps that were issued by the Sharjah Post Office shortly before the formation of the United Arab Emirates, which became part of the class of virtually worthless stamps known to collectors as Dunes. Many of these items feature subjects unrelated to the emirates whose names they bear, and therefore many catalogues do not list them.

Districts and Landmarks

Sharjah is the third largest city in the United Arab Emirates after Dubai and Abu Dhabi.

The city of Sharjah overlooks the Persian Gulf and has a population of over 800,000 (2008). It contains the main administrative and commercial centres together with an array of cultural and traditional projects, including several museums covering areas such as archaeology, natural history, science, arts, heritage, Islamic art and culture. Distinctive landmarks include two major covered souks, reflecting Islamic design, and a number of recreational areas and public parks such as Al Montazah Fun Park and Al Buheirah Corniche. The city is also notable for its numerous elegant mosques.

Rolla Square
Named after the large rolla (banyan tree) that once stood in the square and that inspired the sculpture currently at the centre of the park, Rolla Square is a common location for workers to stroll during the weekends.

Bank Street
Bank street is located near the main area of Rolla. Many bank branches and offices are located on the street.

Al Hisn Sharjah

Sharjah Fort was demolished in the 1970s, but has been rebuilt and is today a museum.

'Smile You're In Sharjah' Roundabout
Located between the Blue Souq and Fish Market, near the Union Bank Tower, the floral call to cheer up etched on the roundabout has lent its name to the roundabout itself.

Gold Souq
The Souq Al Markazi, or Gold Souq, is a tourist destination and comprises a gold souq, clothing souq and, on its first floors, antiques and jewellery shops.

Mahattah Fort
The fort was built to house travellers on the Imperial Airways Eastern Empire route and was the site of Sharjah Airport until 1977. It is now an aviation museum.

Heritage District

The Heart of Sharjah houses several galleries, and museums including the heritage museum which gives a great insight into the cultural traditions of the past. The area is also home to the traditional Souk Al Arsa, a covered souk with an array of items to sell including antiques and the office of the Sharjah Centre for Cultural Communication.

Al Qasba Canal
Al-Qasba Canal is a 1 km-long canal that runs through the center of Sharjah. Located along its waterfront are several apartments, shops and tourist attractions of the Al Qasba community.

Sharjah Heritage Museum
The Sharjah Heritage Museum is situated near to the Bait Al Naboodah is just opposite Soouq Al Arsah. This is an architecturally designed two-storey family house. It is built around a shaded courtyard and is dedicated to a family life reconstruction many years ago. There are many rooms which has displays of traditional furniture along with household items too. Moreover, there are also provision of children's costumes, games and jewellery.

Sharjah National Park

Sharjah Aquarium
Located in Al Layyeh.

Al Noor Island

Al Noor Island is located in the Khalid Lagoon and covers an area of 45,470 square metres. The destination project features art and light installations, including the 'OVO' and 'Torus' displays.

Maryam Island
Maryam Island is a beachfront destination located in Sharjah and oversees the Arabian sea.It's one of the largest projects in the emirate with an investment of 2.4 billion Dirhams (US$650M). The breakthrough masterplanned waterside development will spread across 460,000 square metres, with a built-up area of 310,000 sqm.

Wildlife Centers

The Arabian Wildlife Center opened in 1999 and was home to more than 100 species of animals. Situated at a convenient location, this center was quite close to the Sharjah International Airport. Despite the hot and dry conditions in most of Arabia, there were a number of mammal species who had adapted to these conditions. The Breeding Centre for Endangered Wildlife, a sister facility, was a member of the EAZA, like Al Ain Zoo in the Emirate of Abu Dhabi, but is now closed to the public. The fauna, including the Arabian leopard, which had been recorded in the mountains in the eastern part of the country, there were shifted to Al Hefaiyah Conservation Centre in the eastern area of Kalba. The center's activities had included assisting the Yemeni zoos of Sana'a and Ta'izz with taking care of their fauna in 2001.

Al Majaz Waterfront 
Al Majaz Waterfront is a leisure area, a waterfront landmark of Sharjah Featuring an audio-video dancing fountain, miniature golf and a number of restaurants.

Rain Room

In 2018, the experiential art installation Rain Room was given a permanent home in Sharjah. Sharjah Art Foundation constructed a purpose-built visitor centre located in the city's residential area of Al Majarrah to house the permanent installation of Rain Room.

The Flying Saucer

Reconstructed in 2015 and launched as a redeveloped arts and community center in 2020, The Flying Saucer, Sharjah is a brutalist building dating back to the 1970s. It was re-opened after a two-year renovation project by the Sharjah Art Foundation (SAF).

Sharjah Light Festival
Sharjah Light Festival is held every year since 2010 on various landmarks around Sharjah. It is a display of lights using projectors and lasers on buildings. Usually the shows have a small story line or a theme.

Places of worship 
Sharjah's largest mosque, named the "Sharjah Mosque" was inaugurated in May 2019. Located in the area of Tay, at the junction of the Emirates Road and the road to Mleiha, it can accommodate up to 25,000 worshipers, with an inside capacity of over 5,000 people. Two coins, one gold and one silver, each inscribed with a verse from the Quran, were issued by the Central Bank of the United Arab Emirates, and designed by the Sharjah Islamic Bank, to commemorate the occasion.

Sharjah also has the biggest Moscow-style Russian Orthodox church in the country.

In 1997, a Syriac Orthodox church (St. Mary's Jacobite Syrian Soonoro Patriarchal Cathedral) was consecrated to accommodate a growing population of Syriac Christians, many of whom are migrant workers from Kerala and southern India.

Mleiha Archaeological Centre

Mleiha Archaeological Centre is a visitor center and exhibition based around the history and archaeology of the areas surrounding the village of Mleiha in Sharjah, the United Arab Emirates.

Al Rahmaniyah Parks
In March 2021, the Sharjah Investment and Development authorities opened two parks in the Al Rahmaniyah, Kshisha and Shaghrafa, built in a total area of 147,700 sqm. It included a female-only park, along with entertainment, social, sports and educational facilities.

House of Wisdom
In December 2020, Sultan bin Muhammad Al-Qasimi opened a library inspired by the original House of Wisdom in Baghdad. The building was designed by Foster and Partners, extending over 12,000 square meters. On the grounds of the library is a large art piece entitled "The Scroll", a contemporary interpretation of the ancient Arabic scrolls, made by Gerry Judah. It was made to celebrate the Emirate of Sharjah being named the UNESCO World Book Capital for 2019.

Climate
Sharjah has a hot desert climate (Köppen climate classification BWh), with warm winters and extremely hot summers. During winter, the average daytime temperature rarely exceeds . Rainfall is generally light and erratic, and occurs almost entirely from November to July. About two-thirds of the year's rain falls in the months of February and March.

Transport

Development of transportation services in Sharjah is critical and long term task. Planning by SPTC since 2008 Sharjah Metro will be third in UAE (after Dubai and Abu Dhabi metros) and planning since 2015 Sharjah Tram will be second (after Dubai Tram).

Air
The Sharjah International Airport is the aviation hub of the city. Sharjah Airport is the third largest Middle East airfreight hub in cargo tonnage, according to official 2015 statistics from Airports Council International. Sharjah International Airport is home base of the low-cost carrier Air Arabia. It has daily flights connecting Lebanon, Jordan, United Kingdom, Netherlands, Ukraine, India, Egypt, Syria, Pakistan, Bangladesh, Saudi Arabia, Iran, etc. 

The first international flight to land in Sharjah was in October 5th, 1932, as part of a refuelling stop on Imperial Airways's India to Britain route. The former airport hosted a cinema, hotel, and a restaurant and would eventually become a Royal Air Force military base until 1971, when the United Kingdom left the UAE and remained as the main international airport for the city until 1976 when traffic moved to Sharjah International Airport.

Road
There are two major series of highways in Sharjah, which are "E" and "S". E represents roads connecting other emirates and S for roads within the emirates.

The major roads in the emirate of Sharjah include:
 E 88 - Al Dhaid Road connecting the Emirate of Fujairah.
 E 102 (Maliha Road) - Sharjah - Kalbah Road - Connecting Fujairah and Kalba.
 E 311 - Sheikh Mohammad Bin Zayed Road - connecting Dubai, Ajman and RAK.
 E 11 - Al Ittihad Road - Connecting Dubai.
 E 611 - Emirates Road - connecting Dubai, Ajman and RAK
 S 12 - Maliha Road. 

Taxi

Sharjah Public Transportation Corporation is organizing and supervising the operations of taxis in Sharjah Emirate. Sharjah taxi service is provided through franchise companies. They cover all parts of the Emirate and cities, including shopping centres, residential areas and airport. Following are the major taxi operators in the emirates.
 Sharjah Taxi: Area of operation - Sharjah City and Eastern Regions.
 Emirates Cab: Area of operation - Sharjah city.
 City Taxi: Area of operation - Sharjah City and Eastern Regions.
 Union Taxi: Area of operation - Sharjah city.
 Advantage Taxi: Area of operation - Sharjah City and Central Regions.

Sharjah Transport Corporation also provides Sharing Transportation with the purpose of serving certain routes in Sharjah City on a fixed rate for each route without using the meter.
Sharjah Sharing Taxi routes are carefully selected to support people with low income and are covering areas with frequent needs for quick transfer within same location, to ease the traffic situation in Sharjah.

Intercity Transport
Sharjah Public Transport Corporation operates passenger bus services nationwide, between Sharjah City, Ras Al Khaimah, Khor Fakkan, Kalba, Fujairah, Masafi, Ajman, Umm Al Quwain, Hamriyah Free Zone, Dhaid, Al Madam, Dibba Al Hisn, Abu Dhabi, Al Ain and Dubai.

Utility services 
Utility services in the emirate are provided by SEWA (Sharjah Electricity and Water Authority). They provide electricity, water and LPG connections to about 2 million consumers in the emirates. They have over 4000 employees serving till Dhaid, Kalba and Khorfakkan. Telephone services in the emirate, both fixed lines and mobile services, are provided by Govt. owned Etisalat and Du communication Ltd.

Culture

The UAE culture mainly revolves around the religion of Islam and traditional Arab culture. The influence of Islamic and Arab culture on its architecture, music, attire, cuisine and lifestyle are very prominent as well. Five times every day, Muslims are called to prayer from the minarets of mosques which are scattered around the country. Since 2006, the weekend has been Friday-Saturday, as a compromise between Friday's holiness to Muslims and the Western weekend of Saturday-Sunday.

The Ruler of Sharjah ordered the establishment of several cultural institutions. The projects covered conservation of cultural heritage, active interaction with other cultures, construction of museums and the other cultural, scientific and artistic centres in the Emirate and the setting up of a television satellite channel that reflects and projects the value of culture.

In 1998, Sharjah was awarded the "Cultural Capital of the Arab World" title by UNESCO representing the United Arab Emirates. Sharjah has kept the spirit of its history alive by indicatively incorporating tradition into every aspect of contemporary development.

Sharjah was designated as the World Book Capital for 2019 by UNESCO.

A cultural heritage project, Heart of Sharjah, has been undertaken to preserve and restore the old town of Sharjah and return it to its 1950s state. A five-phase project intended for completion in 2025, the project is being undertaken by the Sharjah Investment and Development Authority, Shurooq, together with Sharjah Institute for Heritage, the Sharjah Museums Department, and the Sharjah Art Foundation.

Sharjah International Book Fair is a cultural event held every year in Sharjah. It started in the year 1982.

Economy

Sharjah is the headquarters of Air Arabia, the first low-cost airline in the Middle East, which operates to the Middle East, Asia and Europe. Its headquarters are located in the Sharjah Freight Center, on the property of Sharjah International Airport.

Sharjah Airport International Free Zone, popularly known as SAIF Zone, is one of the prominent free-trade zones in UAE. More than 6000 companies operates from SAIF Zone. The cost of setting up business in Sharjah is less than in any other emirates of UAE, and the focus of industrialization has in recent years turned Sharjah into a commercial center. Thanks to the facility of 100% foreign ownership, repatriation of capital and profits and exemption from income and corporate taxes, SAIF Zone has attracted investors from more than 90 countries.

Hamriyah Free Zone: Established in 1995, it provides access to a 14 meter deep water port and a 7 meter deep inner harbor.

Shams Media City Free Zone (Shams) was launched in 2017.

Sharjah Publishing City (SPC) serving the global publishing and the media industry.

Demographics
According to 2015 census conducted by department of statistics and community development in Sharjah, the total population of the emirate is 1.40 Million. Expatriates constitute 87% of the total population. As per the census the total number of Emirati population is only 175,432. The population density of the Emirates is 341 person per km2.

Like the rest of UAE, Arabic is the official and national language of the emirate. English is used as a second language; Tagalog and South Asian languages such as Hindi, Odia, Urdu, Malayalam, Tamil, Telugu, Bengali etc. are spoken widely by the residents of emirates. Russian language is also used a lot for the majority European and Central Asian community. Islam is the predominant religion in the Emirate of Sharjah.

Education
There are several public and private schools in addition to universities in Sharjah, including the University of Sharjah, American University of Sharjah, Skyline College Sharjah, Al Qasimia University, Westford School of Management, Exeed School of Business and Finance Sharjah Men's College, and Sharjah Women's College. Some of these universities are located in one area called the University City. Private schools in the city include Wesgreen International School, Westminster School, Victoria English School, the Sharjah Indian School, Sharjah English School, Delta English School, Emirates National School, American Community School Sharjah, Indian School Sharjah, the International School of Choueifat, Sharjah, Sharjah High School, DPS Delhi Private School, Gulf Asian English School, Our Own English High School and the American School of Creative Science.

Human Rights

LGBTQ Rights 
In addition to the UAE federal laws which criminalise homosexuality the penal code in Sharjah actively discriminates against LGBTQ individuals. For example  Article 176 of the Sharjah Penal Code (1970) punishes “unnatural crimes (Sodomy)”—defined as “sexual intercourse with another person in contravention of the laws of nature” or “allowing a male to have intercourse with them in contravention of the laws of nature”— with imprisonment of up to 10 years.  Article 181 establishes that “sexual intercourse” is deemed to have occurred once the sexual organ has entered in the slightest degree, whether or not that entry is accompanied by secretion of semen.

Healthcare

Health care in Sharjah can be divided in to two different sectors, Public and Private. Public hospitals in the emirates are administered by Government of Sharjah through the Ministry of Health. The emirate also has 9 public medical centres to provide primary health care services.

Sports

The Sharjah Cricket Stadium has hosted almost 218 cricket One Day Internationals, more than any other ground, and 4 Test matches. There's also Sharjah in the UAE Pro League. Sharjah also has a chess club.

Also, since IPL 2020 was held in UAE, Sharjah Cricket Stadium was one of the three stadiums to hold the matches.

Notable people 
 Ebtisam AbdulAziz
 Abdulaziz Abdulrahman Almusallam
 Hussain Ayed
 Ahmed Khalil
 Shaykha al-Nakhi
 Lubna Khalid Al Qasimi
 Sultan bin Muhammad Al-Qasimi
 Asmaa al-Zarouni
 Abdullah bin Salem bin Theban

Gallery

See also

 Archaeology of the United Arab Emirates
 Sharjah International Airport
 Sharjah Police Force
 Sharjah Art Foundation
 Hamriyah Port
 Sharjah Museum of Islamic Civilization
 Sharjah International Book Fair
 Sharjah Cup

References

External links
 
  Official website
 Official Sharjah Tourism Website
 Sharjah Media
 Sharjah Museums Department

Persian Gulf
Populated coastal places in the United Arab Emirates
 
Arab Capital of Culture